Sixto María Durán Cárdenas (August 6, 1875 – January 13, 1947) was an Ecuadorian pianist, composer, and lawyer.

Durán Cárdenas was born in Quito on August 6, 1875. He earned a law degree from the Central University of Ecuador in 1889. While he was a renowned, award-winning music composer, he continued to practice law throughout his lifetime because in Ecuador musical careers were not well-paid.

In 1900 President Eloy Alfaro appointed him Intermediate Piano Professor of the newly reopened National Conservatory of Music. In 1911 President Emilio Estrada Carmona appointed him the director of the National Conservatory of Music. He took on this position again in 1923 (for 10 years) and again from 1941-1943.

In 1916 he was the director of the School of Arts and Crafts. In 1918 he suffered a serious accident at the school, where the fingers of his left hand were severed by a machine. While his career as a pianist was over, he continued as a composer throughout his life. His musical works number over 150.

Besides folk music, he liked to compose classical music and chamber music. He also wrote articles for several magazines and newspapers.
 
In 1946 he began suffering from nephritis, and he died at the age of 71 on January 13, 1947.

Personal life
His parents were Domingo Durán, aide-de-camp of President Gabriel García Moreno, and Emperatriz Cárdenas, a singer and notable harpist.

In 1911 Durán Cárdenas married Valentina Miranda. They did not have children.

Works
 La Leyenda del Monte (1911) an operetta with text by Manuel Serrano
 Lágrima Indiana (1911) a musical composition
 Mariana, an operetta
 Cumandá (1916) an opera based on the novel by Juan León Mera, with Libretto by Pedro Pablo Traversari and Enrique Escudero
 Música Incásica (1917)
 Las Bellas Letras en la Instrucción Pública de América (1917)
 Petite Vals (1919)
 La Música Incásica (1919) an article about music
 Brumas (1922), piano composition

 Berceuse (1938), composition
 Yaraví (1941)
 Himno a Alfaro (1942)
 Escuela Primaria (1942) with lyrics by Remigio Romero y Cordero

References 

1875 births
1947 deaths
Ecuadorian pianists
People from Quito
Central University of Ecuador alumni